John Marnell (born 1956) is an Irish retired hurler who played as a left corner-back for the Kilkenny senior team.

Marnell joined the team during the 1975-76 National League and was a member of the team at various intervals for much of the next decade. An All-Ireland medalist in the minor, under-21 and junior grades, he won one All-Ireland winners' medal at senior level as a non-playing substitute.

At club level Marnell is a one-time county club championship medalist with played with Dicksboro.

References

1956 births
Living people
Dicksboro hurlers
Kilkenny inter-county hurlers
Hurling selectors